UFC on Fox: Shevchenko vs. Peña (also known as UFC on Fox 23) was a mixed martial arts event promoted by the Ultimate Fighting Championship held on January 28, 2017, at Pepsi Center in Denver, Colorado.

Background
A potential UFC Women's Bantamweight Championship title eliminator between multiple-time muay thai world champion Valentina Shevchenko and The Ultimate Fighter: Team Rousey vs. Team Tate bantamweight winner Julianna Peña served as the event headliner.

A bantamweight bout between Raphael Assunção and Aljamain Sterling was originally booked for UFC Fight Night: Lewis vs. Abdurakhimov. However, Sterling pulled out due to an undisclosed injury. The fight was later rescheduled for this event.

Yancy Medeiros was expected to face Li Jingliang at the event. However, in early January, Medeiros pulled out for undisclosed reasons and was replaced by promotional newcomer Bobby Nash.

A middleweight bout between former Bellator Middleweight Champion Héctor Lombard and Brad Tavares was expected to take place at this event, but was scrapped on January 10 due to undisclosed reasons.

A week before the event, promotional newcomer John Phillips pulled out of his light heavyweight bout against Marcos Rogério de Lima and was replaced by fellow newcomer Jeremy Kimball.

At the weigh-ins, Lima came in at 209.5 lb, 3.5 lb over the light heavyweight limit of 206 lb. As a result, Lima was fined 20% of his purse, which went to Kimball and the bout proceeded as scheduled at catchweight.

Results

Bonus awards
The following fighters were awarded $50,000 bonuses:
Fight of the Night: Not awarded
Performance of the Night: Valentina Shevchenko, Jorge Masvidal, Francis Ngannou and Jason Knight

See also
2017 in UFC
List of UFC events

References

Fox UFC
Events in Denver
2017 in mixed martial arts
Mixed martial arts in Colorado
Sports competitions in Denver
2017 in sports in Colorado
January 2017 sports events in the United States